is a fictional character from Capcom's Street Fighter fighting game franchise. He was created to parody Ryo Sakazaki and Robert Garcia, the two lead characters of SNK's Art of Fighting series, as Capcom saw Ryo as a ripoff of Street Fighter characters Ryu and Ken. Since then, Dan has become a fan favorite due to his humorous design, signature moves and mannerisms.

Introduced in Street Fighter Alpha, Dan is consistently portrayed as an overconfident, arrogant and utterly feeble character. In the series' storyline, Dan was a student trained by Gouken—elder brother of Akuma—who also trained Ken and Ryu. Gouken stopped training Dan once he acknowledged the ulterior reasons Dan has in his mind. Dan's goal is to defeat Sagat, who killed Go, Dan's father, in a brutal fight that resulted in the loss of Sagat's right eye. After Sagat pretended that he was defeated, Dan opened an unsuccessful school for his fighting style, Saikyo-ryu ("Strongest style").

Appearances
Dan is introduced in Street Fighter Alpha and Street Fighter Alpha 2 as a martial artist who developed his own fighting style called Saikyō-ryū, "The Strongest Style", despite the considerable lack of power in his techniques. During these two games, Dan seeks to defeat Sagat to avenge his father's death. While Dan is an unlockable character in Street Fighter Alpha, in following games he is already available. By Street Fighter Alpha 3, Dan has succeeded in his quest (As Sagat purposefully threw the fight out of pity) and seeks to perfect and promote his fighting style. In this game, he also declares himself the mentor of the fighter Sakura Kasugano and is revealed to be one of Blanka's friends.

Dan also appears in the console versions of Street Fighter IV, entering the tournament in an effort to make his Saikyo-style more popular. He also appears as Sakura's mentor and fights her as a rival in the penultimate fight of his Arcade mode. In Super Street Fighter IV, he continues fighting to promote and gain membership into his Saikyo Dojo which has no members at all. However, his plan fails due to lack of publicity used for his dojo. Dan is used as the "dummy" opponent for the Challenge Mode in the home versions.

Prior to being released as a playable character for the fifth season of downloadable content in Street Fighter V, he provides descriptions of items that players can purchase from the in-game store, occasionally breaking the fourth wall. In the game's story, Dan may have won in a certain world martial arts tournament legally off-screen, but is still dissatisfied about still lacking of students in his dojo. However, thanks to Sakura and Blanka's tips, Dan is inspired by the success of the latter's "Blanka-chan" dolls and attempts to become popular by creating his own variation called "Saikyo-boy" dolls.

His stance as a "weak" character is emphasized in the puzzle game Super Puzzle Fighter II Turbo, in which Dan is a hidden character who drops only red counter gems, making him extremely easy to beat. In Super Gem Fighter Mini Mix, Dan's story begins with himself looking to expand his Saikyo-ryu school and subsequently chooses Sakura as his student. Upon meeting Sakura, he offers to teach her his style and she accepts after Dan defeats her in a fight. Sakura masters the entire Saikyo-ryu style and chooses to forget the entire style three days after mastering it, humiliating Dan.

Dan appears as a playable character in some Capcom crossover projects, including two crossovers with Marvel: Marvel Super Heroes vs. Street Fighter and Marvel vs. Capcom 2 as well as the crossovers with SNK starting with Capcom vs. SNK Pro. During the debut trailer for the crossover fighting game Street Fighter X Tekken, Dan is beaten through a door following an encounter with Tekken character Kazuya Mishima. Even then, Dan does make a non-playable appearance as the "dummy" in the game's training mode. He is also seen in Sakura and Blanka's ending, trapped inside of Pandora. Dan makes a cameo in Sentinel's Marvel vs. Capcom 3 ending, being beaten and dragged by one of the giant robots. In Street Fighter X Mega Man, Dan appears in between stages as Mega Man tests his new weapons on him. Dan is also shown to have a younger sister, Yuriko, who appears in his Marvel Super Heroes vs. Street Fighter ending and as the in-game shopkeeper in Street Fighter V.

Additionally, Dan has had a small appearance in the original video animation Street Fighter Alpha: The Animation. In the manga Street Fighter: Sakura Ganbaru!, Dan is featured as a supporting character. Dan is also featured in UDON's Street Fighter series, where he views Sakura as a rival, though he is usually defeated without much effort on her part. A few issues have revealed that if angered enough he can tap into the Satsui no Hado, but still isn't as intimidating as he trips over Sakura's backpack when he tries to use the Raging Demon. By the time of Super Street Fighter: New Generation (which adapts the events of Street Fighter III), Dan is shown to have lost his dojo and now works as a chef for E. Honda. He assists Guile and Alex in rescuing Ryu and curing Sakura of the Satsui no Hado. In Street Fighter Unlimited, Dan finally faces off against Sagat to avenge his father. Though Sagat dominates him throughout the fight, he gives up out of guilt and gives Dan the opportunity to finish him off, but Dan ultimately refuses to kill him as he realizes it's something his father wouldn't have wanted. Dan' s name is mentioned in Street Fighter: Assassin's Fist as a former student taught by Gouken before Ryu and Ken. In a deleted scene, Gouken tells Ryu and Ken how he taught Dan in his early days as a sensei but sent him due to wanting to use his training for revenge.

Concept and creation
Shortly after the release of Street Fighter II, rival company SNK released their own fighting game, Art of Fighting. The principal character of this series, Ryo Sakazaki, bore a resemblance in appearance and name to Ryu, as well as other aesthetic similarities to Ken, wearing an orange gi and sporting blonde hair.

In humorous retaliation, Street Fighter II co-designer Akiman drew an artwork of Sagat holding a defeated opponent by the head during the release of Street Fighter II: Champion Edition. The defeated opponent wore an attire similar to Ryo's: an orange karate gi with a torn black shirt underneath and geta sandals; but had long dark hair tied to a ponytail like Robert Garcia, another character from the Art of Fighting series. This character design would become the basis of Dan, who was introduced as a secret character in Street Fighter Alpha until finally becoming a selectable character by default in the game's sequel, Street Fighter Alpha 2. His fireball is telling: instead of using both hands to unleash his Gadōken, as Ryu and Ken do for the Hadōken, he propels it with one hand, like Ryo, Robert and Yuri do for the Kooh-ken (though Dan's Gadōken has pitifully short range and does mediocre damage; it only gains longer range when the player uses the super version of the move, the Shinkū Gadōken). Dan can also taunt infinitely like the Art of Fighting games, unlike his fellow Street Fighter Alpha characters who can only taunt once per round in the Alpha series.

When developing Street Fighter IV, executive producer Yoshinori Ono emphasized Dan as a character he strongly wanted to have appear in the game, stating that while the character's personality and actions earned him the label of a joke character, he felt Dan was a very technical fighting game character that could be used well and bring something unique to the game. In a later interview, he emphasized his desire to have Dan in the game again, citing the then-unveiled inclusion of Sakura Kasugano in home versions as added incentive.

Character design
Dan has a similar outfit to Ryu and Ken, wearing a traditional karate gi. Dan also wears a black undershirt like Ryo. His head and face closely resemble Robert (especially the ponytail hairstyle), while his outfit is bright pink, reminiscent of Ryo's orange outfit in Art of Fighting. In Street Fighter IV, the pink of his gi is faded in places, suggesting it was originally white, but turned pink after being mixed in with red-colored laundry.

Though his fighting stance is similar to Ken and Ryu's, it is more "loose" and animated. Many of his mannerisms directly mirror those of Yuri Sakazaki. In Street Fighter IV, Dan's stance more closely resembles Ryo Sakazaki's fighting stance, rather than Ryu and Ken's.

In Street Fighter IV, he can be seen with the kanji 最強流 (Saikyō-ryū) on his lapel. During some moves, the kanji 父 (father) or 弾 (bullet, pronounced 'Dan') appears on his back, similar to Akuma.

Reception

Dan's character has received mostly positive reception from video game publications. IGN ranked him twelfth in their selection of the  "Top 25 Street Fighter Characters", noting his role as a "fan favorite" despite his status as a joke character. GameDaily listed Dan eighteenth in their "Top 20 Street Fighter Characters of All Time" article and the second-most "bizarre" fighting game character of all time, calling him "fun" despite his handicaps. Japanese magazine Gamest rated Dan the top video game character of 1996 and tied him with Darkstalkers character Jedah for the fifth-best out of fifty in 1997. Mikel Reparaz of GamesRadar listed Dan as the number one "in-game in-joke" in 2007, on the grounds of his becoming a fan favorite of "overconfident players who want to show their skills." Reparaz published a feature on the character two years later, calling Dan "a crappy version of Ryu or Ken" who was nonetheless one of the most enjoyable playable characters in the series. The site additionally ranked Dan's "Shisso Buraiken" from Street Fighter IV as one of "gaming's most satisfying uppercuts" in 2010, describing it as a "weaksauce version of Ryu's Dragon Punch."

UGO Networks editor Paul Furfari chose Dan as one of the top 50 best Street Fighter characters, commenting that players could use him to "insult or embarrass a competing player." Arcade Sushi included Dan among their "10 Best Joke Characters of Gaming" in 2013 for the "unforgettable ... laughs he's pulled out of fighting game fans." UGO listed Dan thirteenth in their selection of "The 25 Awesomest Hidden Characters" in gaming. Complex listed Dan eighteenth in their list of the twenty-five best characters in Street Fighter history in 2013, in addition to using his likeness as the lead image for the article. Series producer Yoshinori Ono jokingly announced at the 2011 Comic Con that Dan's absence from Street Fighter X Tekken was due to a Tekken character having "killed" him in a newly released trailer for the game. Jordan Mallory of Joystiq published a mock eulogy of Dan in response. The boss character Chuck from Gogetsuji Legends (1995) was designed as a parody of Dan; Kurt Kalata of Hardcore Gaming 101 said, "In other words, a copy of a copy." 4thletter.net rated Dan's Super Gem Fighter Mini Mix ending, in which Sakura quits his dojo after only a couple days and calls him "worthless", 26th in their 2013 ranking of the top 200 fighting game endings. "When you're talking about Street Fighter and comedy, Dan Hibiki can't be too far behind."

However, Ryan Clements of IGN called Dan the "most embarrassing character" on the SFIV roster and Kotaku's Brian Ashcraft criticized his English voiceover in the game. Complex named Dan the lamest series character in 2012 ("intentionally underpowered with a truncated move list") and sixteenth among their "50 Most Annoying Characters In Video Games" the previous year due to his personality and in-game costume. "Could there be anybody more pathetic? We can imagine that he's an MMA fighter that Dipset once made the mistake of sponsoring." Smosh named Dan among the six "lamest" Street Fighter characters in 2014. "Dan Hibiki may be a joke, but the joke is on the player that selects him."

See also

Johnny Cage

References

External links
 Dan's Street Fighter Alpha, Marvel vs. Capcom, and Street Fighter IV entries at StrategyWiki.org

Fictional Hong Kong people
Fictional karateka
Fictional homeless people
Fictional Japanese diaspora
Fictional martial arts trainers
Fictional martial artists in video games
Fictional unemployed people
Male characters in video games
Parody superheroes
Street Fighter characters
Video game characters introduced in 1995